Halvor Saamundsen (1877 – 1957) was a Norwegian politician for the Communist Party.

He was a manual laborer by occupation. He was a member of Gjerpen municipal council for several years, and the Communist Party top ballot candidate for the 1930 parliamentary election. He was also district secretary in his party, and in 1931 he became a central board member.

References

1877 births
1957 deaths
Communist Party of Norway politicians
Politicians from Telemark